Tulosesus heterosetulosus is a species of mushroom producing fungus in the family Psathyrellaceae.

Taxonomy 
It was first classified as Coprinus heterosetulosus by the French mycologist Marcel Locquin in 1947.

In 2001 a phylogenetic study resulted in a major reorganization and reshuffling of that genus and this species was transferred to Coprinellus.

The species was known as Coprinellus heterosetulosus until 2020 when the German mycologists Dieter Wächter & Andreas Melzer reclassified many species in the Psathyrellaceae family based on phylogenetic analysis.

Description 
It is a coprophilous fungus, known to grow on the dung of either sheep or goats.

References

heterosetulosus
Fungi described in 1976
Fungi of Greece
Tulosesus